The Paramaras of Chandravati ruled the area around the Arbuda mountain (present-day Mount Abu) in India during 10th-13th centuries. Their capital was located at Chandravati, and their territory included parts of present-day southern Rajasthan and northern Gujarat. The most notable ruler of the dynasty was Dharavarsha, who helped his Chaulukya overlords repulse a Ghurid invasion at the Battle of Kasahrada in 1178.

Territory 
{
	"type": "FeatureCollection",
	"features": [
		{
			"type": "Feature",
			"properties": { "marker-symbol": "star", "marker-size": "small", "marker-color": "000080", "title": "Chandravati" },
			"geometry": { "type": "Point", "coordinates": [72.766, 24.450] }
		},
		{
			"type": "Feature",
			"properties": { "marker-symbol": "monument", "marker-size": "small", "title": "Rohida (Roheda)" },
			"geometry": { "type": "Point", "coordinates": [72.964, 24.610] }
		},
		{
			"type": "Feature",
			"properties": { "marker-symbol": "monument", "marker-size": "small", "title": "Pali" },
			"geometry": { "type": "Point", "coordinates": [73.33, 25.77] }
		},
		{
			"type": "Feature",
			"properties": { "marker-symbol": "monument", "marker-size": "small", "title": "Ajari" },
			"geometry": { "type": "Point", "coordinates": [73.045, 24.76] }
		},
		{
			"type": "Feature",
			"properties": { "marker-symbol": "monument", "marker-size": "small", "title": "Achalgarh" },
			"geometry": { "type": "Point", "coordinates": [72.744, 24.599] }
		},
		{
			"type": "Feature",
			"properties": { "marker-symbol": "monument", "marker-size": "small", "title": "Kayadara" },
			"geometry": { "type": "Point", "coordinates": [72.818, 24.565] }
		}
	]
}
The Paramaras of Chandravati ruled the area around the Arbuda mountain (present-day Mount Abu). Their territory, called Arbuda (or Arvvuda in an inscription), spanned over present-day southern Rajasthan and northern Gujarat. Chandravati (also called Chandrapalyam or Chandrapalli in inscriptions), a town at the foot of the mountain, was their capital.

Political history 

The Paramaras of Chandravati ruled between 10th and 13th centuries. The 1161 CE inscription of the Paramara king Ranasimha refers to the Agnivansha myth, stating that the dynasty was created by the sage Vashistha during a ritual sacrifice. It then states that the historical king Utpalaraja was born in this dynasty at Chandrapalli, which is probably an alternative name for the kingdom's capital Chandravati.

The inscription then names and praises Utpalaraja's successors, describing them using stereotyped phrases and double entendres. Dhandhuka, the sixth ruler after Utpalaraja, had at least three sons. Punyapala, or Purnapala, the eldest of these, seems to have died without an heir, and was succeeded by his younger brother Dantivarmman. The throne then passed on to the third son Krishnadeva, whose descendants Kakkaladeva and Vikramasimha also subsequently became the kings. The throne then passed on to Dantivarmman's descendant Yashodhavala.

According to Ranasimha's 1161 CE inscription, he was a son of Vikramasimha, and ruled after Yashodhavala. However, the Roheda inscription states that Yashodhavala's son Dharavarsha succeeded him on the throne, and that Ranasimha obtained the throne "for a while" (or "in the meanwhile"). Ranasimha's 1161 CE inscription states that Ranasimha vanquished the "immense army" of Malava at the Parnna river. The Roheda inscription also refers to this victory, although the relevant verse can be read interpreted to mean that either Ranasimha or Dharavarsha obtained this victory. Based on the Roheda inscription, epigraphist H. V. Trivedi theorizes that while Dharavarsha was busy fighting an invasion from Malava, Ranasimha usurped the throne for a brief period. Historian R. C. Majumdar theorizes that it was Ranasimha who defeated the Malava army as the king of Chandravati, and subsequently ceded power to Dharavarsha. Dániel Balogh, who edited Ranasimha's 1161 CE inscription, considers another possibility that Ranasimha acted as a regent for Dharavarsha. Balogh notes that Dharavarsha's earliest inscription is dated 1163 CE (1120 VS), while his last inscription dated 1219 CE (1276 VS). This means, he ruled for at least 56 years, which is unusually long for the dynasty. Thus, it is likely that he inherited the throne when he was a child, and had Ranasimha as his regent during his early regnal years.

Epigraphist H. V. Trivedi identified the Parnna river as the Purna stream that flows beside the Girvad (Girwar) village near Mount Abu and Chandravati. Balogh doubts the accuracy of this identification, noting that this stream is too insignificant to be mentioned as a landmark in the inscription, and is not located on the way from Chadnravati to Malava, where the battle was likely fought. According to Balogh, "Parnna" may be a shorter form of "Parnnasha" (IAST: Parṇṇāśā), which is most likely another name for the Banas River.

Dharavarsha, who ruled as a Chaulukya feudatory, is regarded as the greatest ruler of the dynasty. According to Partha-Parakrama-Vyayoga, a text composed by his younger brother Prahladana, he repulsed a Chahamana attack at night. Dharavarsha was one of the Chaulukya vassals who repulsed a Ghurid invasion at the Battle of Kasahrada in 1178; he is called "Darabaraz" (Hasan Nizami) or "Darabaras" (Firishta) by the Muslim chroniclers writing about the battle.

Religion 

The 1161 CE inscription of Ranasimha begins with an invocation to Shiva, describing him as the "stage director" of the world's creation, and naming Brahma and Vishnu as his assistants.

List of rulers 

The following is a list of Paramara rulers of Chandravati, with approximate regnal years, as estimated by epigraphist H. V. Trivedi. The rulers are sons of their predecessors unless noted otherwise:

Yashodhavala's last inscription is dated c. 1150 CE (1207 VS); Ranasimha's inscription is dated 1161 CE (1218 VS); and Dharavarsha's earliest inscription is dated c. 1163 CE (1220 VS). This suggests that Ranasimha either held the throne sometime between 1150 and 1163, or acted as a regent during Dharavarsha's early regnal years.

Inscriptions 

Some of the dynasty's inscriptions, written in Sanskrit language and Nagari script, include:

 An inscription of Ranasimha from an unknown find spot, dated 1218 VS (1 November 1161 CE). Now in a private collection. It was edited and translated and edited by Sanskritologist Dániel Balogh in 2010. It records the grant of Pippala-grama village and surrounding lands to the entire brahmana priestly community of the Vasa village. The inscription also refers to an earlier land donation by his father Vikramasimha. The inscription was inscribed by Soniya, the grandson of a Kayastha from Gauda.
 Fragmentary Rohida (Roheda) inscription, now lost
 Pali inscription of Dharavarsha
 Ajari inscription, dated 1223 VS
 Achalgadh inscription of Yashodhavala
 Achaleshvara inscription, dated 1225 VS
 Kayadra stone inscription of Dharavarsha

See also 

 Paramara dynasty
 History of Rajasthan
 List of Rajput dynasties and states

References

Bibliography 

 
 
 

10th-century establishments in India
13th-century disestablishments in India
Dynasties of India
Agnivansha
History of Gujarat
History of Rajasthan
Sirohi district